Hardik is a  Hindu male given name. It is an adjective which means "from the heart" in Hindi; "hard" is Hindi for "heart". Notable people with the name include:

Hardik Gohel (Indian computer scientist and educational leader)
Hardik Mehta (Indian writer and director)
Hardik Pandya (Indian cricketer)
Hardik Patel (Indian political activist)
Hardik Patel (Indian cricketer)
Hardik Rathod (Indian cricketer)
Hardik Sethi (Indian cricketer)
Hardik Singh (Indian field hockey player)
Hardikpreet Singh (Hong Kong-born Indian professional footballer)
Hardik Shah (Indian civil servant)
Hardik Tamore (Indian cricketer)

Hindu given names